William Holmes McGuffey (September 23, 1800 – May 4, 1873) was a college professor and president who is best known for writing the McGuffey Readers, the first widely used series of elementary school-level textbooks. More than 120 million copies of McGuffey Readers were sold between 1836 and 1960, placing its sales in a category with the Bible and Webster's Dictionary.

Early years 

William Holmes McGuffey, born September 23, 1800, was the son of Alexander and Anna (Holmes) McGuffey near Claysville in West Finley Township, Washington County, Pennsylvania, which is 45 miles southwest of Pittsburgh. His family, who had strong opinions about education and religion, immigrated from Scotland to the United States in 1774. In 1802, the McGuffey family moved farther out into the frontier at Tuscarawas County, Ohio. He attended country school, and after receiving special instruction at Youngstown, he attended Greersburg Academy in Darlington, Pennsylvania.

Early career and college education 
At the age of 14, he was a roving instructor in a one-room schoolhouse in Calcutta, Ohio. He traveled through the frontier of Ohio, Kentucky, and western Pennsylvania. He was "one of an army of half-educated young men who tramped the roads and trails drumming up 'subscription scholars'." His students generally brought their Bibles, because there were few textbooks at that time. He taught children from the age of six to twenty-one. He taught in frontier schools, often eleven hours a day and six days a week.

In between jobs as a teacher, he attended and graduated in 1826 from Pennsylvania's Washington College, where he became an instructor. He was close friends with Washington College's President Andrew Wylie and lived in Wylie's house for a time; they often would walk the three miles to Washington College together.

Career and life 

McGuffey left Washington College in 1826 to become a professor of ancient languages at Miami University in Oxford, Ohio. In 1832, he was transferred to the chair of moral philosophy.

In 1829, he was licensed as a minister in the Presbyterian Church at Bethel Chapel. He preached frequently during the remainder of his life. 

Truman and Smith, a Cincinnati publisher, wanted to publish a series of four graded readers for schoolchildren. Based upon a recommendation from Harriet Beecher Stowe, they hired McGuffey. His brother Alexander Hamilton McGuffey wrote the fifth and sixth readers for the McGuffey Readers series. His books sold over 120 million copies and still continue to be used for homeschooling.

In 1836, he left Miami to become president of Cincinnati College, where he also served as a distinguished teacher and lecturer.  He left Cincinnati in 1839 to become the 4th president of Ohio University, which he left in 1843 to become president of what was then called the Woodward Free Grammar School in Cincinnati, one of the country's earliest public schools.

From 1843 to 1845, he was a professor in Woodward College in Cincinnati. While in Cincinnati he began the preparation of an "Eclectic" series of readers and spellers, which became popular, and have been many times revised and reissued. From 1845 till his death, he occupied the chair of moral philosophy and political economy in the University of Virginia in Charlottesville, Virginia.

Personal life 

He was married to Harriet Spinning of Dayton, Ohio in 1827. They had five children, who were expected to act with submission and obedience, according to one of their daughter's diary. McGuffey believed in the importance of education and religion to live successful lives.

McGuffey and Harriet had as many as three slaves while at Virginia. One of these enslaved individuals was William Gibbons, who was hired out to them. Gibbons was literate. He was said to be self-taught and also said to have been instructed by McGuffey's daughter Maria. He later became a minister in Charlottesville and Washington, D.C. 

Harriet was ill during the summer of 1850 and was taken to her parents' home in Woodside by McGuffey. Her health did not improve as hoped and she died on July 3. She was buried in Woodside Cemetery. He later married Miss Laura Howard, daughter of Dean Howard of the University of Virginia. They had one daughter, Anna. She died at the age of four. 

During the American Civil War and the Reconstruction era, McGuffey was generous in his donations to the poor and African Americans. McGuffey died May 4, 1873 at the University of Virginia, and is buried in the University of Virginia Cemetery, in Charlottesville, Virginia.

Influences 
McGuffey was Henry Ford's favorite author and was always proud of his exposure to McGuffey's teachings, which "reinforced an ordered, rigid, and straightforward view of the world where white was white and black was black".

Legacy 
Named for William Holmes McGuffey's influential primers that first appeared in 1836 and remained in print until 1921, the McGuffey longevity awards recognize long-lived, still-in-use textbooks of excellence.

Places named after McGuffey:
 The William H. McGuffey Primary School in Charlottesville, VA bears his name.  The historic building is currently an artist-run cooperative arts center, currently known as the McGuffey Art Center. Enslaved workers of University of Virginia faculty, including the McGuffey household, lived in McGuffey Cottage, which is preserved behind Pavilion IX at the University of Virginia.
 McGuffey High School and Middle School in Claysville, Pennsylvania. In 1998, the Pennsylvania Historical and Museum Commission installed a historical marker  noting McGuffey's historic importance.

 Ohio University's Department of University Advancement is housed in a building named McGuffey Hall.
 At Miami University, McGuffey Hall is a large academic building home to several education-related departments. The university ran the McGuffey Laboratory School from 1910 until 1983 on its campus. When the school closed, some of the parents started The William Holmes McGuffey School Foundation which operates an independent progressive school in Oxford called the McGuffey Foundation School. The school was later renamed the McGuffey Montessori School.
 The McGuffey School District in Washington County, Pennsylvania is named for William Holmes McGuffey.

Notes

References

Further reading
 Biography Reference Bank. The H. W. Wilson Company, 2007.
 John Hardin Best. "McGuffey, William Holmes"; American National Biography Online Feb. 2000.
  Richard D. Mosier. Making the American Mind: Social and Moral Ideas in the McGuffey Readers (1947)
 John H. Westerhoff III. McGuffey and His Readers: Piety, Morality, and Education in Nineteenth-Century America'' (1978).

External links
 
 William Holmes McGuffey - Digital collection maintained by the Miami University Libraries
 William Holmes McGuffey & McGuffey Eclectic Readers collection. Walter Havighurst Special Collections, Miami University Libraries.
 
 
 

 

1800 births
1873 deaths
American non-fiction writers
American people of Scotch-Irish descent
University of Cincinnati faculty
Presidents of the University of Cincinnati
Fabulists
Miami University faculty
People from Tuscarawas County, Ohio
Writers from Cincinnati
Writers from Youngstown, Ohio
Writers from Charlottesville, Virginia
Presidents of Ohio University
Washington & Jefferson College alumni
Washington & Jefferson College faculty
Burials at the University of Virginia Cemetery
People from Oxford, Ohio